Andorra began taking part in the quadrennial Mediterranean Games in 2001.

Overview

By event

See also
Andorra at the Olympics
Andorra at the Paralympics

External links
Medals table per country and per Games at the official International Committee of Mediterranean Games (CIJM) website